The University of Salento (called until 2007 Università degli Studi di Lecce) is a university located in Lecce, Italy. It was founded in 1955 by Giuseppe Codacci Pisanelli.

The university of Salento commenced activities in the academic year 1955-1956 under the "Salentine University Council". In 1960, it became the "Free University of Lecce" and passed to Government authority in the 1967–1968 academic year.

Since 2005, the University of Salento is a partner of the Euro-Mediterranean Center for Climate Change (CMCC).

University of Salento is ranked 251-275 among the top world's university and fifth in Italy, according to the Times Higher Education World University Rankings released on 2015. In 2018, it was ranked 501–600, according to the Times Higher Education World University Rankings.

Organization and Programmes
The university is divided into 8 departments, which offer the following programmes:

Department of Biological and Environmental Sciences and Technologies 
Bachelor's Programmes:
Biology
Biotechnology
Environmental Sciences and Technologies
Viticulture and Oenology
Motor and sport sciences
Sustainable development under changing climate
Nursing
Master's Programmes:
Experimental and applied biology
Coastal and Marine Biology and Ecology (taught in English)
Environmental Sciences
Medical Biotechnology and Nanobiotechnology
Sciences and techniques of preventive and adapted physical activities
Unique cycle master's degree
Medicine and surgery

Department of Cultural Heritage 
Bachelor's Programmes:
Cultural Heritage
Discipline of performing arts and music
Master's Programmes:
Archeology
History of art
Sciences of performing arts and audiovisual production
Digital humanities (taught in English)

Department of Economics Sciences 
Bachelor's Programmes:
Business economics
Economics and finance
Management of tourism organizations
Digital management
Master's Programmes:
Business management
Economics, finance and insurance
Tourist and cultural entities management

Department of Human and Social Sciences
Bachelor's Programmes:
Political Science And International Relations
Psychological Science and  Techniques
Social Service
Sociology
Socio-Cultural Educator
Master's Programmes:
Pedagogical Counseling and Planning Of Educational Processes
Planning and Management Of Social Policies and Services
Primary Education Sciences (five years)
Methodology of The Psychological Intervention
Geopolitical and International Studies
Sociology and Social Research

Department of Humanities 
Bachelor's Programmes:
Communication Sciences
Foreign Languages, Cultures and Literatures
Literature
Philosophy
Language Mediation
Master's Programmes:
Classical Literature
Modern Literature
Modern Languages, literature and Translation
Philosophical Sciences
Public, Economic and Institutional Communication
Technical Translation and Interpreting

Department of Engineering for Innovation
Bachelor's Programmes:
Civil Engineering
Industrial Engineering (Cittadella della ricerca campus)
Industrial Engineering (Ecotekne campus)
Information Engineering
 Biomedical engineering
 Engineering for sustainable industry
Master's Programmes:
Aerospace Engineering (taught in English)
Civil Engineering
Communication Engineering and Electronic Technologies (taught in English)
Computer Engineering (taught in English)
Management Engineering (taught in English)
Materials Engineering and Nanotechnology (taught in English)      
Mechanical Engineering

Department of Law Studies 
Bachelor's degree
Sports law and management
Master's degree
Euro-Mediterranean migration policies and governance
 Unique cycle master's degree
 Law (five years)

Department of Mathematics and Physics "Ennio De Giorgi" 
Bachelor's Programmes:
Mathematics
Optics and Optometry
Physics
Master's Programmes:
Mathematics
Physics

Sports, clubs, and traditions
The University Sports Centre (in Italian Centro Universitario Sportivo - CUS) houses all the sporting activities that take place for enrolled students at the University of Salento.

All courses are taught by qualified and nationally certified instructors including a variety of disciplines, gymnastics, volleyball, basketball, aerobics, funky, tennis, fencing, Latin American dance, swimming, aqua gym, body building, step, and breathing training.

Body building can be found at the "Mario Stasi" sports centre in Via Vincenzo Cuoco, and there are also agreements with local swimming pools.

The CUS takes part annually in the Italian University Games and appears annually on the list of National University Champions demonstrating a high level of participation.
In addition to this the CUS Lecce also organises a series of game competitions, with individual end of course tournaments and le Cussiardi.

Also for student members, it's also possible to take part in winter and summer camps with agreements with C.U.S.I. It possible to do alpine ski-ing, ski jumping snowboarding and carving in the following localities, Fai della Pagnella (TN), Folgaria (TN), and Valzodana (BL) while it is possible to do windsurfing, canoeing, and sub-aqua courses in Muravera (CA), Terasini (PA), and San Cristoforo- Lake Caldonazzo (TN)

See also 
 Higher education in Italy
 Lecce
 List of aerospace engineering schools
 List of engineering schools
 List of Italian universities
 Lists of law schools
 List of optometry schools
 List of schools of international relations
 Salento

References

External links
University of Salento Website 
Times Higher Education-World University Rankings 2015

 
Universities in Italy
University of Salento
University of Salento
Educational institutions established in 1955
Buildings and structures in the Province of Lecce
Education in Apulia
1955 establishments in Italy